Jayam Manade is a 1956 Indian Telugu-language swashbuckler film, produced by Sundarlal Nahatha and directed by T. Prakash Rao. It stars N. T. Rama Rao and Anjali Devi, with music composed by Ghantasala. The film was dubbed into Tamil with the title Vetri Veeran. Ku. Sa. Krishnamoorthi wrote the dialogues and lyrics while the music was composed by T. M. Ibrahim, though the tunes were almost the same as Telugu.

Plot 
Once upon a time, there was a kingdom, whose Emperor (Gummadi) was on vacation and left the administration to his Jagirdar Mahipathi (C.S.R.), who is innocent, ineffective, and greedy. Taking advantage of his weakness for money, the army chief Prachanda (R. Nageswara Rao), who is cruel and equally greedy, fleeces the people with taxes beyond their ability to pay and usurps their property. In one such incident, he causes the death of Rosaiah (Perumallu), a sick old man who once was a valiant soldier. His son Pratap (N. T. Rama Rao) seeks to avenge his father's death. He is supported by his friend Jogulu (Relangi) and his sister Mallika (Sowcar Janaki), who nurtured a secret admiration for him. Along with Jogulu, he inspires a group of youths to revolt against their oppressors. Pratap robs Mahipathi & Prachanda and helps the poor. Prachanda announces a reward for his captors. When Mahipathi's daughter princess Shobha Devi (Anjali Devi) is on her way to the palace, Jogulu enacts a kidnap drama, Pratap in disguise saves her, and introduces himself as Pradeep. Shobha and Pratap are smitten with each other. But Prachanda has designs to marry Shobha. This leads to some comic and some tense situations. The story takes an interesting turn when a veiled person who revealed Shobha later saves Pratap in a piquant situation and later when the emperor in disguise finds the truth behind the chaos in his empire. He imprisons Prachanda and declares Pratap as his heir. Finally, the movie ends on a happy note with the marriage of Pratap & Shobha.

Cast 
N. T. Rama Rao as Pratap
Anjali Devi as Shobha Devi
R. Nageswara Rao as Prachandudu
Gummadi as Maharaju
C.S.R. as Samanta Raju Mahipathi
Relangi as Joogulu
Perumallu as Rosaiah
Sowcar Janaki as Mallika

Soundtrack 

Music composed by Ghantasala.

References

External links 
 

Films directed by T. Prakash Rao
Films scored by Ghantasala (musician)
Indian swashbuckler films
Films scored by T. M. Ibrahim
1950s Tamil-language films
1950s Telugu-language films
Indian black-and-white films